Trechus buahitensis is a species of ground beetle in the subfamily Trechinae. It was described by Jeannel in 1954.

References

buahitensis
Beetles described in 1954